Hurricane Zeta was a late-season major hurricane in 2020 that made landfall on the Yucatán Peninsula and then in southeastern Louisiana, the latest on record to do so at such strength in the United States. Zeta was the record-tying sixth hurricane of the year to make landfall in the United States. The twenty-seventh named storm, twelfth hurricane and fifth major hurricane of the extremely active 2020 Atlantic hurricane season, Zeta formed from a broad area of low pressure that formed in the western Caribbean Sea on October 19. After battling wind shear, the quasi-stationary low organized into Tropical Depression Twenty-Eight on October 24. The system strengthened into Tropical Storm Zeta early on October 25 before becoming a hurricane the next day as it began to move northwestward. Hurricane Zeta made landfall on the Yucatán Peninsula late on October 26 and weakened while inland to a tropical storm, before moving off the northern coast of the peninsula on October 27. After weakening due to dry air entrainment, Zeta reorganized and became a hurricane again, and eventually a Category 2 hurricane, as it turned northeastward approaching the United States Gulf Coast on October 28. Zeta continued on through Mississippi and parts of Alabama with hurricane-force winds. Zeta gradually weakened as it accelerated northeastward, and became post-tropical on October 29, as it moved through central Virginia, dissipating shortly afterwards off the coast of New Jersey. After bringing accumulating snow to parts of New England, the extratropical low-pressure system carrying Zeta's remnant energy impacted the United Kingdom on November 1 and 2.

Numerous tropical cyclone watches and warnings were issued in areas that had already dealt with other tropical cyclones throughout the season, including Hurricane Delta, which took a near-identical track three weeks prior. States of emergencies were issued in Louisiana, Mississippi, and Alabama. Heavy rain in Jamaica led to a landslide that killed a man and his daughter when it hit their family home on October 24. In Mexico, strong winds and storm surge knocked down tree branches onto flooded streets in Playa del Carmen, Quintana Roo, near where Zeta made landfall. Heavy rain, storm surge, and strong winds also impacted the Southeastern United States and at least six fatalities were confirmed in the region. Downed power lines and numerous crashes were a result in New England after the remnants of the system brought heavy accumulating snow to parts of the region. Overall, Zeta caused at least $4.4 billion in damage throughout its path: $3.9 billion in the United States and $50 million in the Caribbean.

Meteorological history

At 00:00 UTC on October 15, the National Hurricane Center (NHC) began to monitor the southern Caribbean Sea for the possible development of a broad area of low pressure over the region. A large area of unsettled weather developed over the southwestern Caribbean by October 19 due to the combination of a tropical wave and a trough of low pressure. Although unfavorable upper-level winds prevented further development of the tropical wave, southerly flow from that system caused Zeta's precursor trough to drift northward. Three days later, satellite images and radar data showed that the system, located near Grand Cayman Island at the time, was gradually becoming better organized. Following an increase of deep convection overnight into the morning of October 24, satellite data indicated that a well-defined low formed by 12:00 UTC October 24, marking the formation of Tropical Depression Twenty-Eight. Upon formation, it became the earliest 27th Atlantic tropical or subtropical storm on record, surpassing the old mark of November 29, set by Hurricane Epsilon in 2005.

Dry air wrapped around the northern half of Zeta's circulation as it moved off shore over the southern Gulf of Mexico, leaving its center partially exposed, though it began to re-intensify on October 28, in a conducive environment of low shear and warm Sea surface temperatures. It then began to accelerate, turning towards the northeast because of an approaching upper-level low and associated cold front moving across the Southern Plains while ridging was located off the Southeast Atlantic U.S. Coast. While within the swift flow between these systems, Zeta rapidly intensified as it moved quickly, with a forward speed of (toward the Louisiana coast. Despite marginal sea-surface temperatures and increasing wind shear, the storm's velocity kept it from weakening. This made Zeta the latest major hurricane to strike the continental United States in the calendar year on record, surpassing the 1921 Tampa Bay hurricane. The storm began to gradually weaken as it moved directly over New Orleans and then into southern Mississippi. Several days later, the low-pressure system carrying Zeta's remnant energy brought heavy rain and strong winds to parts of the United Kingdom.

Preparations

Cayman Islands and Jamaica
Flash flood warnings were issued in parts of Jamaica and the Cayman Islands, where a small craft warning was also issued in the latter.

Cuba
Upon formation, a Tropical Storm Watch was issued for the province of Pinar del Río. This was upgraded to a warning soon after. However, the storm went a bit further south than expected, and no significant impacts were felt there.

Mexico
In Quintana Roo, people were still recovering from Hurricane Delta, which hit the region about three weeks prior. The state government set up several shelters for residents and tourists, while transport was suspended. Some boats that usually carry tourists anchored among mangroves to avoid the waves and winds of Hurricane Zeta.

United States

Hurricane watches were issued for eastern and central coastal Louisiana and coastal Mississippi. A tropical storm watch was also issued for areas east of Intracoastal City to Morgan City, Louisiana, as well as coastal Alabama. Storm surge watches were issued for the entire area as well. The western part of watches and warnings were trimmed as the storm approached and the forecast track became better established. Inland tropical storm warnings were issued as far north as southern Virginia. Two tornado watches were ultimately issued for this storm; they stretched from southeast Louisiana into southwestern Georgia. As the storm began to merge with a cold front, winter weather advisories were issued for inland New England with the threat of accumulating snow causing problems on roads.

Louisiana
On October 26, Louisiana Governor John Bel Edwards issued a state of emergency for the entire state. The town of Grand Isle issued a mandatory evacuation on October 27 as a voluntary evacuation was ordered for Jean Lafitte that same day. Tulane University moved classes to virtual learning on October 28, while also closing health centers on campus. Cleco employed more than 200 new workers to help restore power in the aftermath of Zeta. Several national park units were shut down to weather the storm.

Mississippi
Mississippi Governor Tate Reeves declared a state of emergency ahead of Zeta on October 28. This was preceded by Hattiesburg and Forrest County's emergency declarations which were issued on October 27. Schools in Pascagoula, Gautier, Biloxi, and Long Beach were closed on October 28 and 29 although schools in Pascagoula and Gautier only had early releases on October 28.

Alabama
On October 27, Alabama Governor Kay Ivey issued a state of emergency. Baldwin EMC stocked on supplies and put extra crews on standby ahead of Zeta to help restore power in parts of the state.

Elsewhere
Tropical Storm Warnings were issued as far inland as the Carolinas and Virginia on October 28, with the likelihood of tropical-storm-force sustained winds and gusts likely in the areas.

After the storm moved offshore, the threat of blowing snow and other wintry weather in New England prompted Winter Weather Advisories for much of inland New England on October 29 and 30. The residents of the area were warned of slick roads and unsuitable driving conditions with the wintry weather.

Impact

Cayman Islands and Jamaica
A man and his daughter were killed in Jamaica after a landslide hit the family's home on October 24. The landslide was due to heavy rain likely from the precursor to Zeta. The precursor of Zeta caused J$2 billion (US$13.7 million) in infrastructural damage. Later, Zeta also caused US$18 million to roads and US$13 million in agricultural losses.

Mexico
Tree branches were littered across flooded streets in Playa del Carmen, Quintana Roo, near where Zeta made landfall. However, Quintana Roo Governor Carlos Joaquin stated on Twitter that no major damage or casualties had been reported in the state. He also allowed airports and business to re-open just hours after landfall, but forced beaches to remain closed until surf calmed. Damage in Quintana Roo was relatively minor, and only reached MX$4.1 million (US$195,000).

United States
A number of tornado warnings were issued in Louisiana, Mississippi, Alabama, and Florida. Over 2 million customers in the United States lost power.

Louisiana

Sustained tropical storm force winds began spreading onshore in southeastern coast of Louisiana around 18:00 UTC on October 28.

A gas station was damaged in Grand Isle and a tree fell on a home in Chauvin. Numerous utility lines were downed in Houma and storm surge flooded LA 1 in Golden Meadow while also depositing a boat on it. The eye of Zeta moved directly over New Orleans, where winds gusted to 94 mph, a large tree was snapped in Bayou St. John, and a tree was blown down onto a car in the Garden District. The airport reported a pressure of 973 mb as the eye moved overhead. One person was hospitalized after a roof collapsed on a building in the city, and another person was also killed due to electrocution from downed power lines. Overall, Zeta caused $1.25 billion damage in Louisiana.

Mississippi
Bay St. Louis experienced maximum sustained winds of 80 mph with gusts to 103 mph at approximately 7:00 PM local time. This was followed shortly after by peak storm surge recorded at 9.99 ft. The only tornado reported while Zeta was a tropical cyclone occurred in Noxubee County on October 28. It was rated EF1 (on the Enhanced Fujita Scale) and caused about $30,000 in damage. The storm surge flooded the parking garage at the Golden Nugget Casino in Biloxi, leaving several cars partially submerged. Wind gusts of near  were reported in Forrest County. Trees were blown down in eastern Marion County and in Lamar County south of U.S. 98. Additionally, there were sporadic reports of home damage in the region. One death was recorded in Biloxi when a person was found dead on the Broadwater Marina, having drowned after being surrounded by storm surge. Overall, Zeta caused $650 million damage in Mississippi.

Alabama
Strong winds impacted Mobile, which was still recovering from Hurricane Sally from the month prior. A National Ocean Service station at the Bayou La Batre Bridge reported  of storm surge as well. One person died when a tree fell on a mobile home in rural Clarke County. Overall, Zeta caused $825 million damage in Alabama.

East Coast of the United States

After interacting and merging with the winter storm located over the Southern Plains, Zeta caused widespread wind damage throughout the rest of the Southeastern United States. Zeta crossed over Northern Georgia beginning at 05:00 UTC on October 29, causing major impacts, especially in Metro Atlanta. In Acworth, Georgia, a large oak tree was uprooted and fell on a mobile home, killing a man. Two other adults and a child were in the home at the time of the incident but were not injured. Two other people in Buford, Georgia, also died from a tree falling onto their house. Nearly a million people in Metro Atlanta were without power the morning after the storm. Thousands of people in Metro Atlanta were still without power four days after the storm, in addition to at least one polling location which was to be used for the 2020 elections, resulting in an emergency change in such locations. Overall, Zeta caused $1.1 billion damage in Georgia.

In North Carolina, sustained tropical-storm force winds moved over the entire state. Overall, Zeta caused $550 million damage in the Carolinas and $25 million in Virginia.

In parts of southern New England and upstate New York, the remnants of post-tropical cyclone Zeta brought accumulating snow to the region, after interacting with a cold front also moving through. This early-season snowstorm resulted in some downed tree branches in the region. The snowstorm also caused slippery road surfaces, leading to numerous crashes, some serious, in the state of Massachusetts. Highs that day struggled to get into the 40s.

United Kingdom

The remnant energy of Zeta crossed the United Kingdom on November 1–2, less than a day after Storm Aiden had impacted the country. Due to the risk of further heavy rainfall across areas previously impacted by Aiden, the Environment Agency issued more than 40 flood alerts ahead of the arrival of Zeta's remnants. The system re-intensified into a hurricane-force extratropical cyclone while centered off the western coast of Scotland on 1 November. Heavy rainfall resulted in the River Wharfe bursting its banks in West Yorkshire, flooding properties in the town of Otley.

It was responsible for flooding in North Wales after bringing prolonged heavy rainfall to the region. The village of Dolgarrog suffered extensive damage after flash flooding inundated the entire village, including Dolgarrog railway station, causing the suspension of services along the Conwy Valley line. In Betws-y-Coed, the A5 road was closed; the nearby Dolgellau Bypass was also closed due to flooding. Several rivers burst their banks, including the River Dee, causing damage in Bangor-on-Dee, Corwen, Llangollen and Wrexham. In Trefriw, officers from North Wales Police rescued several residents from flooded homes overnight.

High winds also caused disruption to transport. Along the A55 road in north Wales, speed restrictions were in place on the Britannia Bridge and around Conwy Tunnel, while Dyfi Bridge on the A487 was closed. The A525 was blocked by fallen trees. The M62 motorway was closed between Leeds and Manchester after high winds caused a lorry to overturn, landing on top of a van in the next lane. At Birmingham Airport, high winds caused difficulty for arriving aircraft.

See also 

 Tropical cyclones in 2020
 List of Louisiana hurricanes (2000–present)
 List of Category 3 Atlantic hurricanes
 List of costliest Atlantic hurricanes
 1921 Tampa Bay hurricane – The second latest major hurricane to strike the continental United States in a calendar year on record
 Hurricane Camille (1969) – Category 5 hurricane which caused catastrophic impact on Mississippi Coast
 Hurricane Juan (1985) – Category 1 hurricane that became the longest lasting hurricane ever recorded in Louisiana
 Hurricane Katrina (2005) – Destructive hurricane which caused catastrophic impacts to similar areas as a high-end Category 3 hurricane
 Hurricane Ida (2009) – Category 2 hurricane that affected similar areas in November 2009
 Hurricane Sandy (2012) –  Another hurricane which produced rare snowfall
 Hurricane Nate (2017) – Category 1 hurricane which brought similar impacts to Mississippi in October 2017
 Hurricane Delta (2020) – Category 4 hurricane that took a similar track three weeks earlier
 Hurricane Ida (2021) – Category 4 hurricane that took a similar track a year later

Notes

References

External links

 The National Hurricane Center's Advisory Archive on Hurricane Zeta

Tropical cyclones in 2020
Category 3 Atlantic hurricanes
2020–21 North American winter
2020 Atlantic hurricane season
2020 in Mexico
2020 in Louisiana
2020 in Mississippi
2020 in Alabama
2020 in Georgia (U.S. state)
2020 in Florida
2020 in South Carolina
2020 in North Carolina
2020 in Virginia
2020 in Maryland
2020 in Delaware
Atlantic hurricanes in Mexico
Hurricanes in Louisiana
Hurricanes in Mississippi
Hurricanes in Alabama
Hurricanes in Georgia (U.S. state)
Hurricanes in Florida
Hurricanes in South Carolina
Hurricanes in North Carolina
Hurricanes in Virginia
Hurricanes in Maryland
Hurricanes in Delaware
Hurricanes in New England
October 2020 events in the United States